The following are the musicians who have performed with drummer and singer-songwriter Phil Collins during Collins's solo career. This does not necessarily include any of the musicians who performed with Collins alongside Genesis.

"Not Dead Yet" Tour Musicians 
This is a list of performers who toured with Collins in 2017/2018/2019 during the Not Dead Yet Tour.
 Phil Collins - lead vocals, percussion
 Nic Collins - drums, piano
 Daryl Stuermer - lead guitar
 Leland Sklar - bass guitar
 Brad Cole - keyboards, vocoder on "In the Air Tonight", musical director.
 Luis Conte - percussion (except Dublin, Lyon and Hyde Park dates)
 Richie Garcia - percussion (only Dublin, Lyon and Hyde Park dates)
 Ronnie Caryl - rhythm guitar
 Arnold McCuller - backing vocals (except Paris, Dublin and Hyde Park dates)
 Amy Keys - backing vocals
 Bridgette Bryant - backing vocals
 Lamont van Hook - backing vocals
 Harry Kim - trumpet
 Dan Fornero - trumpet
 George Shelby - saxophone
 Luis Bonilla - trombone

2016 Performances musicians
This is a list of performers who performed with Collins during the 2016 concerts:

Phil Collins - lead vocals
Brad Cole - keyboards, vocoder on "In the Air Tonight". 
Luis Conte - percussion
Nathan East - bass guitar, backing vocals (only on the 29th of August, US Open performance)
Leland Sklar - bass guitar
Daryl Stuermer - lead guitar
Nic Collins - drums

"First Final Farewell" Tour musicians
This is a list of performers who toured with Collins in support of his 2002 album, Testify, during the First Final Farewell Tour.

Phil Collins - drums, lead vocals, electric piano
Gerald Albright - saxophone
Bill Cantos - backing vocals
Ronnie Caryl - rhythm guitar, backing vocals
Brad Cole - keyboards, vocoder on "In the Air Tonight".
Luis Conte - percussion
Lynne Fiddmont-Lindsey - backing vocals
Dan Fornero - trumpet
Connie Jackson-Comegys - backing vocals
Amy Keys - backing vocals
Harry Kim - trumpet, horns director
Arnold McCuller - backing vocals
Leland Sklar - bass guitar
Daryl Stuermer - lead guitar
Chester Thompson - drums
Lamont Van Hooke - backing vocals
Arturo Velasco - trombone

Live members

Timeline

Former and guest studio musicians
Stephen Bishop - backing vocals
Gary Barnacle - saxophone
Alex Brown - backing vocals
Paul Bushnell - bass guitar
Eric Clapton - guitar
David Crosby - backing vocals
Martyn Ford - strings conductor
David Frank -   Minimoog bass, keyboards
Peter Gabriel - backing vocals
John Giblin - bass guitar
Nick Glennie-Smith - keyboards
Alphonso Johnson - bass guitar
Marva King - backing vocals
Arif Mardin - strings conductor
Dominic Miller - guitar
James Muhoberec - keyboards
Pino Palladino - bass guitar
Joe Partridge - slide guitar
Tim Pierce - guitar
Eric Rigler - Uilleann pipes
James Sangar - additional programming
Ronnie Scott - tenor saxophone
L. Shankar - violins, vocal effects
Sting - backing vocals
Helen Terry - backing vocals
Steve Winwood - Hammond organ

All past touring members worked with Phil in the studio except for Bryant, Lawson, Mahon, White and Odom Jr.

See also
Phil Collins discography
List of awards and nominations received by Phil Collins

Lists of musicians
Phil Collins